T. gracilis may refer to:
 Taterillus gracilis, the gracile tateril or slender gerbil, a rodent species found in Africa
 Thomasomys gracilis, the slender Oldfield mouse, a rodent species found in Ecuador and Peru
 Tornieria gracilis, a dinosaur species
 Tribolonotus gracilis, a skink species found in New Guinea
 Trimeresurus gracilis, a venomous pitviper species found only in Taiwan
 Troglohyphantes gracilis, a Kočevje subterranean spider species
 Trypeta gracilis, a fruit fly species
 Tupaia gracilis, the slender treeshrew, a treeshrew species found in Indonesia and Malaysia
 Thalassina gracilis, a species of mud lobster in the genus Thalassina

See also
 Gracilis (disambiguation)